Edit Kovács (born 15 July 1951) is a retired Hungarian swimmer who won a silver medal in the 4 × 100 m freestyle relay at the 1970 European Aquatics Championships. She competed in five events at the 1968 and 1972 Summer Olympics. Her best achievements were in the 4 × 100 m freestyle relay, where her team finished fifth and fourth in 1968 and 1972, respectively.

References

1951 births
Living people
Swimmers at the 1968 Summer Olympics
Swimmers at the 1972 Summer Olympics
Olympic swimmers of Hungary
Hungarian female swimmers
European Aquatics Championships medalists in swimming
Hungarian female freestyle swimmers
Swimmers from Budapest
20th-century Hungarian women
21st-century Hungarian women